Kholgo is a rural locality (a selo), one of three settlements, in addition to Neryuktyayinsk 2-y and Berdinka, in Neryuktyayinsky 2-y Rural Okrug of Olyokminsky District in the Sakha Republic, Russia. Its population as of the 2002 Census was 79.

References

Notes

Sources
Official website of the Sakha Republic. Registry of the Administrative-Territorial Divisions of the Sakha Republic. Olyokminsky District. 

Rural localities in Olyokminsky District